Inverness East, Nairn and Lochaber, was a county constituency of the House of Commons of the Parliament of the United Kingdom from 1997 to 2005. It elected one Member of Parliament (MP)  by the first-past-the-post system of election.

There was also an Inverness East, Nairn and Lochaber constituency of the Scottish Parliament, which was created with the same boundaries in 1999.

Boundaries
The constituency was created as one of three to cover the Highland council area. The other two were Ross, Skye and Inverness West and Caithness, Sutherland and Easter Ross.

The Highland area had become a unitary council area in 1996, under the Local Government etc (Scotland) Act 1994, and new constituency boundaries divided the areas of some of the former districts of the Highland region. The Highland area had been covered, previously, by the three constituencies of Inverness, Nairn and Lochaber, Ross, Cromarty and Skye and Caithness and Sutherland.

In 2005, constituency boundaries were redrawn again, and the Highland area was divided between three new constituencies (of which one carried forward the name of an older constituency): Inverness, Nairn, Badenoch and Strathspey, Ross, Skye and Lochaber and Caithness, Sutherland and Easter Ross.

Members of Parliament
Throughout its relatively short existence, the constituency was represented by a single MP, David Stewart of the Labour Party.

Election results

Election Results of the 2000s

Election Results of the 1990s

References 

Historic parliamentary constituencies in Scotland (Westminster)
Constituencies of the Parliament of the United Kingdom established in 1997
Constituencies of the Parliament of the United Kingdom disestablished in 2005
Highland constituencies, UK Parliament (historic)